The Group One Levin Classic - formerly the Bayer Classic - is one of the premier races for three-year-old thoroughbreds in New Zealand.

History

The race, first run under the name Levin Turf Classic, was originally run at Levin Racecourse until that facility was closed as a racing venue in 1990 and the race was transferred to nearby Ōtaki.

For more than a decade the race was sponsored by Bayer, and known as the Bayer Classic.

For much of its history, the race was run at Levin and then Ōtaki on the last Friday in November.  

Concern began to grow in the 2000s about the race's close proximity to the New Zealand 2000 Guineas and New Zealand 1000 Guineas, both run in the second week in November. The three Group 1 3-year-old races over a mile in the New Zealand racing season were all run within the space of three weeks, leading to an inevitable dilution of quality of fields. From 2014 the Levin Classic was moved to Trentham Racecourse in Wellington and initially run as part of the Wellington Cup Carnival in January conducted by the Wellington Racing Club.  

Since 2022 it has been run in March, on the same day as the:

 New Zealand Oaks.
 Cuddle Stakes (1600m for fillies and mares).
 New Zealand St. Leger (2600m).
 Lightning Handicap (1200m)

Notable winners

Among the most famous winners are Bonecrusher, Veandercross, O'Reilly, Our Flight, Russian Pearl, Tit For Taat and Wahid.

Race results

See also

  Recent winners of major NZ races for 3 year olds
 Otaki-Maori Weight for Age
 Trentham Stakes
 Thorndon Mile
 Karaka Million
 Hawke's Bay Guineas
 New Zealand Derby
 New Zealand Oaks
 New Zealand 1000 Guineas
 New Zealand 2000 Guineas

References

 N.Z. Thoroughbred Racing Inc.
 http://www.racenet.com.au
 http://www.nzracing.co.nz
 http://www.tab.co.nz
 http://www.racebase.co.nz
 The Great Decade of New Zealand racing 1970-1980. Glengarry, Jack. William Collins Publishers Ltd, Wellington, New Zealand.
 New Zealand Thoroughbred Racing Annual 2018 (47th edition). Dennis Ryan, Editor, Racing Media NZ Limited, Auckland, New Zealand.
 New Zealand Thoroughbred Racing Annual 2017 (46th edition). Dennis Ryan, Editor, Racing Media NZ Limited, Auckland, New Zealand.
 New Zealand Thoroughbred Racing Annual 2008 (37th edition). Bradford, David, Editor.  Bradford Publishing Limited, Paeroa, New Zealand.
 New Zealand Thoroughbred Racing Annual 2005 (34th edition). Bradford, David, Editor.  Bradford Publishing Limited, Paeroa, New Zealand.
 New Zealand Thoroughbred Racing Annual 2004 (33rd edition). Bradford, David, Editor.  Bradford Publishing Limited, Paeroa, New Zealand.
 New Zealand Thoroughbred Racing Annual 2000 (29th edition). Bradford, David, Editor.  Bradford Publishing Limited, Auckland, New Zealand.
 New Zealand Thoroughbred Racing Annual 1997  (26th edition). Dillon, Mike, Editor. Mike Dillon's Racing Enterprises Ltd, Auckland, New Zealand.
 New Zealand Thoroughbred Racing Annual 1995 (24th edition). Dillon, Mike, Editor. Mike Dillon's Racing Enterprises Ltd, Auckland, New Zealand.
 New Zealand Thoroughbred Racing Annual 1994 (23rd edition). Dillon, Mike, Editor. Meadowset Publishing, Auckland, New Zealand.
 New Zealand Thoroughbred Racing Annual 1991  (20th edition). Dillon, Mike, Editor. Moa Publications, Auckland, New Zealand.
 New Zealand Thoroughbred Racing Annual 1987 (16th edition). Dillon, Mike, Editor. Moa Publications, Auckland, New Zealand.
 New Zealand Thoroughbred Racing Annual 1985 (Fourteenth edition). Costello, John, Editor. Moa Publications, Auckland, New Zealand.
 New Zealand Thoroughbred Racing Annual 1984 (Thirteenth edition). Costello, John, Editor. Moa Publications, Auckland, New Zealand.
 New Zealand Thoroughbred Racing Annual 1982 (Eleventh edition). Costello, John, Editor. Moa Publications, Auckland, New Zealand.
 New Zealand Thoroughbred Racing Annual 1981 (Tenth edition). Costello, John, Editor. Moa Publications, Auckland, New Zealand.

Horse races in New Zealand
Flat horse races for three-year-olds
Levin, New Zealand